The Bank Hospital also known as The Bank of Ghana Hospital is a hospital in Ghana completed in 2017. The hospital is located at Cantonment in Accra. As of November 2019, the hospital had been left empty for 2 years after completion, in a deteriorating state, after the New Patriotic Party assumed office in 2017 and claimed to be making an audit on the facilities to ensure value for money.

References 

Hospitals in Ghana